The South Bridge Act 1785 (25 Geo III c.28) was a public act of the United Kingdom Parliament concerning the South Bridge, for rebuilding or improving the University of Edinburgh, for enlarging the public markets, for lighting the said city, for providing an additional supply of water, for extending the royalty of the said city for levying an additional sum of money for statute labour in the middle district of the county of Edinburgh, to complete the mound and to erect a bridge between the road to Leith and Calton Hill across Calton Street.

South Bridge Scheme

The first specific proposal for a South Bridge was produced on 6 September 1775 with the publication of a pamphlet setting out heads of a Bill. The promoters were a Committee of Heritors of the Shire of Edinburgh, including Henry Dundas who acted as Chairman, and the Duke of Buccleuch.

In 1784 the scheme for the South Bridge was revived and with it the hopes of rebuilding the College on the exiting site. Andrew Dalzel wrote to a friend in December : "It is now resolved to build a bridge across the Cowgate, passing between the College and the Infirmary. It is thought that when the posteriors of the College are exposed, people will be shamed into building a new College." This startling prospect gave rise to another pamphlet, published in early 1785 by James Gregory, Professor of the Theory of Medicine, in the form of "A letter to the Right Honourable Henry Dundas on the Proposed Improvements in the City of Edinburgh."

Trustees for the University of Edinburgh and the South Bridge Act 1785

 James Hunter Blair; Lord Provost of Edinburgh
 The right honourable Henry Dundas of Melville
 The right honourable Ilay Campbell; Lord Advocate of Scotland
 Sir William Forbes; Baronet of Pitfligo
 Robert Macqueen of Braxfield esquire, Senator of the College of Justice
 Archibald McDowal esquire; Merchant and Dean of the Guild of Edinburgh
 John Grieve esquire; Merchant in Edinburgh
 Mr. William Jamieson; Mason and Convener of the Trades of Edinburgh
 John Davidson esquire; Writer to the Signet
 Niel McViccar esquire; Merchant in Edinburgh
 James Brown esquire; Architect

References

1785 in Scotland
Acts of the Parliament of the United Kingdom concerning Scotland